Madoryx oiclus is a moth of the  family Sphingidae. It is known from  Suriname, French Guiana and from Venezuela to Costa Rica. It has also been recorded in Paraguay, Argentina and Bolivia.

Description 
The wingspan is 76–93 mm.

Subspecies 
Madoryx oiclus oiclus (Paraguay, Argentina and Bolivia, Suriname, French Guiana and from Venezuela to Costa Rica)
Madoryx oiclus jamicensis Neidhoefer, 1968 (Jamaica)

References 

Dilophonotini
Moths described in 1870
Moths of South America
Taxa named by Pieter Cramer